Ian Michael Richards (born 9 December 1957) is a former English cricketer. Richards was a left-handed batsman who bowled right-arm medium pace. He was born in Stockton-on-Tees, County Durham.

Richards made his first-class debut for Northamptonshire against Oxford University in 1976. He played first-class cricket for Northamptonshire from 1976 to 1979, making 23 first-class appearances. In his first-class career for the county, he scored 467 runs at an average of 22.23, with a high score of 50. This score, his only first-class fifty, came against Nottinghamshire in 1976. With the ball, he took 7 wickets at a bowling average of 28.71, with best figures of 4/57. His List A debut also came in 1976, when Northamptonshire played Nottinghamshire in the John Player League. Richards made nine further List A appearances for the county, the last of which came against Yorkshire in the 1979 John Player League. In his ten List A matches for Northamptonshire, he scored 44 runs at an average of 8.80, with a high score of 18. With the ball, he took 2 wickets at an average of 76.00, with best figures of 1/22.

He later joined Durham, making his debut for the county in the 1981 Minor Counties Championship, playing a match each against Shropshire. He played Minor counties cricket for Durham in 1981 and 1982, making six appearances. He made a single List A appearance for the county in the 1982 NatWest Trophy against Surrey. In this match, he scored 9 runs before being dismissed by Kevin Mackintosh, with Surrey winning by 111 runs.

References

External links
Ian Richards at ESPNcricinfo
Ian Richards at CricketArchive

1957 births
Living people
Cricketers from Stockton-on-Tees
English cricketers
Northamptonshire cricketers
Durham cricketers
Cricketers from Yorkshire